Alexandru Covalenco (born 25 March 1978 in Tiraspol, Moldavian SSR) is a retired Moldovan footballer.

Career
In February 2002, he joined Dynamo Moscow, signing a 5-year contract.

He was the member of nation team in 2002 and 2006 FIFA World Cup qualification (UEFA).

References

External links
 
 

1978 births
Living people
People from Tiraspol
Moldovan footballers
Association football defenders
Moldovan expatriate footballers
Expatriate footballers in Russia
Expatriate footballers in Belarus
Moldova international footballers
Russian Premier League players
CS Tiligul-Tiras Tiraspol players
FC Dynamo Moscow players
FC Volgar Astrakhan players
FC Rotor Volgograd players
FC SKA-Khabarovsk players
FC Chernomorets Novorossiysk players
FC Torpedo Moscow players
FC Neman Grodno players
FC Sportakademklub Moscow players